Sam Weller (born January 31, 1967) is an American journalist, and author of fiction and nonfiction, best known for being writer Ray Bradbury's authorized biographer. Weller's 2005 book, The Bradbury Chronicles: The Life of Ray Bradbury (HarperCollins) is a full-biography and winner of the Society of Midland Author's Award in the "Biography" category. 2010's Listen to the Echoes, The Ray Bradbury Interviews (Melville House Publishing) is a collection of interviews, photos, mementos, and artifacts. Weller's 2014 Ray Bradbury: The Last Interview: And Other Conversations (Melville House Publishing) features his last interview with Bradbury, and recounts Bradbury's influences, creative processes, and love for writing and reading.

Biography
Weller was born in Lake Forest, Illinois. His The Bradbury Chronicles: The Life of Ray Bradbury was a Los Angeles Times best-seller, winner of the 2005 Society of Midland Authors Award for Best Biography, and a Bram Stoker Award finalist. The companion book, Listen to the Echoes: The Ray Bradbury Interviews, was published by Melville House/Stop Smiling Books in 2010 and was also a Bram Stoker Award finalist.. With Mort Castle,  Weller co-edited the anthology Shadow Show: All-New Stories in Celebration of Ray Bradbury (William Morrow Paperbacks, July 2012), winner of the 2013 Bram Stoker Award for "Superior Achievement in an Anthology." The anthology was also a Shirley Jackson Award nominee.

In 2014, Weller edited Ray Bradbury: The Last Interview (Melville House), his final conversations with the writer. The book also included several previously unpublished rough draft essays by Bradbury, dictated to Weller. Also in 2014, IDW Comics released a five-issue Shadow Show comic book series curated and largely scripted by Weller and Mort Castle. The graphic novel compendium of this series was the recipient of the Bram Stoker Award for "Superior Achievement in Graphic Novels."

Weller is the former Midwest correspondent for Publishers Weekly magazine. He has written for The Paris Review, Playboy, All Things Considered, Slate Magazine, The Huffington Post, National Public Radio and The Los Angeles Review of Books.

Weller's short fiction has appeared in books, literary journals and magazines, including the Chicago Reader, Printers Row Journal, and Rosebud. His pop-cultural essays have appeared in Post Road, Huffington Post Annalemma, and PopMatters, among many other publications. Weller is a former associate professor in the Department of Creative Writing at Columbia College Chicago.

In September 2020, Weller's acclaimed collection of short stories, Dark Black, was published by Hat & Beard Press. Newcity said: "With this collection, Weller is making an argument that he’s more than Bradbury’s chronicler. Weller is arguing he’s Bradbury’s literary heir. By sheer story quality alone, Weller makes a good damn argument."

In February 2022, Cara Dehnert, a former Columbia College Chicago professor, told NBC 5 Chicago that a relationship with a colleague spiraled and that she was the victim of rape and manipulation. The colleague in question was named in her widely circulated post on Medium, and was later identified by the Columbia Chronicle newspaper as Sam Weller when the college retained a law firm to investigate this and other allegations against him. Weller was issued a Notice of Dismissal on July 8, 2022, as a result of the investigation conducted by the law firm Mayer Brown LLP. In an email statement, President and CEO Kwang-Wu Kim announced, "Based on Mayer Brown's findings that Professor Weller engaged in conduct that violated the college's sexual harassment and other policies, Provost Marcella David concluded that the conduct warranted termination."

Bibliography
Secret Chicago: The Unique Guidebook to Chicago's Hidden Sites, Sounds & Tastes (2000)
The Bradbury Chronicles: The Life of Ray Bradbury (2005)
Listen to the Echoes: The Ray Bradbury Interviews (2010)
Shadow Show: All New Stories in Celebration of Ray Bradbury (2012, editor with Mort Castle)
"Roadside Cross" (Short Story, 2014)
Ray Bradbury: The Last Interview: And Other Conversations (2014) 
"Shadow Show Comic #3" (2015)
"Shadow Show Comic #4" (2015)
"Shadow Show Comic #5" (2015)
"Shadow Show: Stories in Celebration of Ray Bradbury" Graphic Novel (2015) 
Dark Black (2020)

References

External links

2005 Interview with Bookslut
2010 Interview with The Paris Review
2014 Interview with Carl Alves 
2020 

1967 births
Living people
American male journalists
Columbia College Chicago faculty
Writers from Chicago
People from Lake Forest, Illinois
Journalists from Illinois
20th-century American journalists